Dangerous Minds is a 1995 American drama film directed by John N. Smith and produced by Don Simpson and Jerry Bruckheimer. It is based on the autobiography My Posse Don't Do Homework by retired U.S. Marine LouAnne Johnson, who in 1989 took up a teaching position at Carlmont High School in Belmont, California, where most of her students were African-American and Latino teenagers from East Palo Alto, a racially segregated and economically deprived city. Michelle Pfeiffer stars as Johnson.  The critical consensus on Rotten Tomatoes calls it "rife with stereotypes". The film grossed $179.5 million and led to the creation of a short-lived television series.

Plot
Louanne Johnson, a former Marine, applies for a teaching job in high school, and is surprised and pleased to be offered the position with immediate effect. Showing up the next day to begin teaching, however, she finds herself confronted with a classroom of tough, sullen teenagers, all from low-income working-class backgrounds, involved in gang warfare and drug pushing, flatly refusing to engage with anything.

They immediately coin the nickname "White Bread" for Louanne, due to her race and apparent lack of authority, to which Louanne responds by returning the next day in a leather jacket and teaching them karate. The students show some interest in such activities, but withdraw when Louanne tries to teach the curriculum.

Desperate to reach the students, Louanne devises classroom exercises that teach similar principles to the prescribed work but using themes and language that appeal to the students. She also tries to motivate them by giving them all an A grade from the beginning of the year and arguing that the only thing required of them is that they maintain it.

In order to introduce them to poetry, Louanne uses the lyrics of Bob Dylan's "Mr. Tambourine Man" to teach symbolism and metaphor; once this is achieved, she progresses on to Dylan Thomas's "Do not go gentle into that good night". Louanne rewards the students liberally, using candy bars, reward incentives, and a trip to a theme park. Her methods draw the attention of the school authorities, George Grandey and Carla Nichols, who try to force her to remain within the curriculum.

A few particular students attract Louanne's interest for their personal problems. Raul Sanchero is a boy who is frequently involved in gang warfare and street crime. Louanne tries to encourage him to focus by paying a special visit to his family to congratulate him on his work and going to dinner with him as a way of instilling confidence and self-respect.

Emilio Ramirez is her most troublesome personal "project", as he believes strongly in a sense of personal honor that prevents him from asking for help. When Louanne discovers that his life is in danger because of a personal grudge held by a recently released thug, she advises him to seek help from Principal Grandey. The next day, Emilio visits Grandey, but Grandey (not realizing that Emilio is in serious danger) instantly dismisses him because he neglected to knock on the door before entering his office.

Feeling rejected, Emilio leaves the school and is subsequently killed by his rival. Heartbroken by her failure to protect Emilio and angry at the indifferent school system for contributing to his death, Louanne announces to the class her intention to leave the school at the end of the academic year. The students immediately break down, begging her not to leave. Overwhelmed by their unbridled display of emotion, she decides to stay.

Cast

 Michelle Pfeiffer as LouAnne Johnson
 George Dzundza as Hal Griffith
 Courtney B. Vance as George Grandey
 Robin Bartlett as Carla Nichols
 Beatrice Winde as Mary Benton
 John Neville as Waiter
 Lorraine Toussaint as Irene Roberts
 Renoly Santiago as Raul Sanchero
 Wade Dominguez as Emilio Ramirez
 Bruklin Harris as Callie Roberts
 Marcello Thedford as Cornelius Bates
 Karina Arroyave as Josy
 Paula Garcés as Alvina
 Ivan Sergei as Huero
 Gaura Vani as Warlock (credited as Gaura Buchwald)
 Cynthia Avila as Mrs. Sanchero
 Roman Cisneros as Mr. Sanchero
 Camille Winbush as Tyeisha Roberts
 Al Israel as Mr. Santiego
 Jeffrey Garcia as Raoul

Production
Dangerous Minds was one of the last films of producer Don Simpson. The school at which LouAnne Johnson taught, Carlmont High School in Belmont, California, was considered as a filming location, but Burlingame High School in Burlingame was used as the filming location for all the outside scenes, and some indoor scenes filmed at neighboring San Mateo High School. Most of the filming was done at Warner Hollywood Studios in Burbank, California.

The amusement park scene was done in Santa Cruz, California, at the Santa Cruz Beach Boardwalk. Additional photography was also done in Pacoima, Monrovia, Glendale, and Sherman Oaks.

Release

Box office
Dangerous Minds was released in the United States on August 11, 1995. It grossed a total of $179.5 million worldwide.

Critical reception
Rotten Tomatoes gives the film an approval score of 33% and an average rating of 4.8/10 based on 43 reviews from critics. The website's "Critics Consensus" for the film reads, "Rife with stereotypes that undermine its good intentions, Dangerous Minds is too blind to see that the ones it hurts are the audience." On Metacritic, the film holds a score of 47 out of 100 sampled from 18 reviews, indicating "mixed or average reviews".

Janet Maslin of The New York Times called it a "false and condescending film" that "steamrollers its way over some real talent".  Although praising Pfeiffer's acting ability, Maslin said that the script limits her to a one-dimension role. Kenneth Turan's review for the Los Angeles Times said that Pfeiffer "is as believable as the film allows her to be", but the film trivializes the subject matter. Roger Ebert wrote in his review for the Chicago Sun-Times called the film "less than compelling" and said the true story had been watered down to appeal to white audiences, illustrated by the substitution of Dylan songs for rap songs. Though he said Pfeiffer's acting made the film "fairly entertaining", Terrence Rafferty of The New Yorker criticized the film's screenplay and the sentimental ending, which he said gives Pfeiffer's character an unnecessary halo. Peter Travers in Rolling Stone described the young cast as "outstanding" and praised Pfeiffer's performance, but he said the film "often unspools like a hokey update of Sidney Poitier's To Sir With Love". Kevin McManus also praised the acting, though he wrote in The Washington Post that the film "merits only a C", in part because the script's lack of subtlety and the saccharine lines given to the students. Edward Guthmann in the San Francisco Chronicle wrote: "It's contrived, it's hokey, but in Dangerous Minds, a Michelle Pfeiffer vehicle, it works surprisingly well… She's playing with a bag of clichés, but she's so plucky and likable, you overlook the hokum." Time Out wrote: "Actually it's quite a respectable piece of work, with an impressive tough-love performance from Pfeiffer, but Ronald Bass's hackneyed screenplay is all carrot and no stick."

Accolades

The soundtrack and its lead single "Gangsta's Paradise" enjoyed major success and received nominations for the Grammy Award for Record of the Year and the NAACP Image Award for Outstanding Soundtrack Album. Coolio won the Grammy Award for Best Rap Solo Performance for his vocals.

At the MTV Movie Awards 1996, Dangerous Minds was nominated in four categories: Best Movie, Best Female Performance (Michelle Pfeiffer), Most Desirable Female (Michelle Pfeiffer) and Best Movie Song (Coolio).

The music video for "Gangsta's Paradise", featuring Michelle Pfeiffer, won the MTV Music Video Award for Best Rap Video and the MTV Music Video Award for Best Video from a Film.

Michelle Pfeiffer won the Blockbuster Entertainment Award for Favorite Actress – Drama.

The film is recognized by American Film Institute in these lists:
 2004: AFI's 100 Years...100 Songs:	
 "Gangsta's Paradise" – Nominated

Soundtrack

Television series
The commercial success of the film prompted the creation of a spin-off television series, Dangerous Minds, featuring Annie Potts in the role of LouAnne Johnson. The series premiered on ABC on September 30, 1996, and ended on March 15, 1997, after one season of seventeen episodes.

See also
 To Sir, with Love
 Freedom Writers
 List of teachers portrayed in films
 List of hood films

References

External links

Website of LouAnne Johnson

1995 films
1995 drama films
1990s American films
1990s biographical drama films
1990s English-language films
1990s high school films
1990s Spanish-language films
1990s teen drama films
American biographical drama films
American high school films
American teen drama films
Biographical films about educators
Cultural depictions of American women
Films about teacher–student relationships
Films adapted into television shows
Films based on autobiographies
Films directed by John N. Smith
Films produced by Don Simpson
Films produced by Jerry Bruckheimer
Films set in the San Francisco Bay Area
Films shot in Burbank, California
Films with screenplays by Ronald Bass
Hollywood Pictures films
Hood films
Teen crime films